Gagea lojaconoi  is a Mediterranean and Black Sea species of plants in the lily family. It is native to Sardinia, Sicily, and Turkey.

Gagea lojaconoi  is a bulb-forming herb with yellow flowers and green or red stems.

The species is named for Italian botanist Michele Lojacono Pojero (1853-1919).

References

lojaconoi
Flora of Italy
Flora of Turkey
Plants described in 1909